Limnaecia cirrhozona is a moth of the family Cosmopterigidae. It is known from Australia.

Adults have blackish forewings and transverse white or orange markings.

References

Limnaecia
Moths described in 1923
Moths of Australia
Taxa named by Alfred Jefferis Turner